Bethany Reservoir State Recreation Area is a state park unit of California, United States, adjoining the Bethany Reservoir.  It is located in Alameda County, near Livermore.

Situated in the northernmost part of the San Joaquin Valley, Bethany Reservoir State Recreation Area is a popular place for water-oriented recreation, especially fishing and windsurfing.  The reservoir stores water for a pumping plant on the California Aqueduct.

See also
 List of California state parks

References

External links
Bethany Reservoir State Recreation Area

California State Recreation Areas
Parks in Alameda County, California
Parks in the San Francisco Bay Area
Protected areas established in 1974